Nuclear or Not? Does Nuclear Power Have a Place in a Sustainable Energy Future? is a 2007 book edited by Professor David Elliott.  The book offers various views and perspectives on nuclear power. Authors include:

Paul Allen from the Centre for Alternative Technology 
Dr Ian Fairlie, who served on the Committee Examining Radiation Risks of Internal Emitters (CERRIE)
Stephen Kidd of the World Nuclear Association

Professor Elliott calls for continued debate on the nuclear power issue.  He has worked with the United Kingdom Atomic Energy Authority before moving to the Open University where he is Professor of Technology Policy and has developed courses on technological innovation, focusing in particular on renewable energy technology.

See also
List of books about nuclear issues
Nuclear Power and the Environment
Reaction Time
Contesting the Future of Nuclear Power
Non-Nuclear Futures

References

External links
Non-nuclear sustainable energy futures for Germany and the UK

Nuclear power
Environmental non-fiction books
2007 non-fiction books
2007 in the environment
British non-fiction books
Books about nuclear issues